Hallyburton Johnstone  (23 August 1897 – 10 August 1970) was a New Zealand politician of the National Party.

Biography

Johnstone was born in Raglan in 1897, the son of Campbell Johnstone. He was educated at Te Uku, Whata Whata, and Auckland Grammar School. He served in the NZEF from 1916 to 1918. In 1920, he married Gladys R. Morris, with whom he was to have three sons. He farmed sheep and cattle in the Raglan area.

He won the Raglan electorate in 1946 in the by-election caused by the death of the previous MP, Robert Coulter. However, he only held the electorate from 5 March to 27 November 1946 as he was defeated by Alan Baxter in the 1946 general election.

In 1949 he won Raglan back for National, and held it to 1957 when he instead contested and won the  electorate. He held this seat until his retirement in 1963.

In the 1966 New Year Honours, Johnstone was appointed an Officer of the Order of the British Empire for services to farming and in political life.

References

External links 
 1946 photo

1897 births
1970 deaths
People educated at Auckland Grammar School
New Zealand National Party MPs
New Zealand military personnel of World War I
New Zealand MPs for North Island electorates
Unsuccessful candidates in the 1946 New Zealand general election
Members of the New Zealand House of Representatives
New Zealand Officers of the Order of the British Empire